Bálint Kiss (29 December 1802, Szentes – 27 January 1868, Pest) was a Hungarian painter and graphic artist.

Biography
His father, also named , was a well-known Presbyterian minister and educator. he attended the public schools in Debrecen and was enrolled at the Academy of Fine Arts Vienna in 1827. He returned to Szentes in 1830 and attempted to make a living as a portrait painter. 

He didn't receive enough orders, so he became an itinerant painter, eventually settling in Debrecen in 1834, where he painted landscapes and altarpieces in addition to portraits. He also made sketches of the actors at the National Theater which appeared in the journal Honművész (National Artist). His first exhibition was at the Art Association of Pest in 1840. Three years later, he was appointed to be one of the art conservators at the original location of the Hungarian National Museum.

In 1846, he created one of his best-known works, János Jablonczai Pethes Says goodbye to his Daughter at the Window of the Dungeon at Leopoldvár in 1674. Although the critics were not impressed, it proved to be very popular with the public. Presumably, this was a factor in his promotion to Curator of the gallery in 1847. In this position, he helped to organize the museum's first major art exhibition after its relocation.

In 1850, following the Revolution, he was dismissed due to his participation in various reform movements. He continued to work while in his forced retirement, producing a four-volume collection of lithographs in 1853 and a great variety of works on Hungarian history. In 1861, he was reinstated during Archduke Albrecht's Germanization campaign, but never truly attained his former status.

References

Further reading
 Károly Lyka: Nemzeti romantika (National Romanticism), Corvina Kiadó, Budapest, 1982, 
 György Seregélyi: Magyar festők és grafikusok adattára (Hungarian Painters and Graphic Artists), Szeged, 1988,

External links

1802 births
1868 deaths
History painters
19th-century Hungarian painters